Unbalanced may refer to:

 Lacking physiological balance
 Unbalanced line, where the impedance of the two conductor paths are not equal
 Unbalanced circuit, a circuit with unbalanced ports, usually with one terminal connected to common
 An unbalanced formation in American football
 Unbalanced chemical equations

Music
Un-balanced
Unbalanced Load second album by comedian Doug Benson
 "Unbalanced", song by The 77s from EP (The 77s EP)
 "Unbalanced", song by Artery (band)	1980